Shooting Stars is a 1983 American made-for-television action comedy film starring Billy Dee Williams and Parker Stevenson.

It was the pilot for a proposed TV series which did not eventuate. However, it aired as a stand-alone TV movie on ABC on July 28, 1983.

Plot
Two actors who play detectives are fired from their jobs. They decide to go into business as private investigators.

Cast
Billy Dee Williams as Douglas Hawke
Parker Stevenson as Bill O'Keefe
John P. Ryan as Detective Mcgee
Edie Adams as Hazel
Fred Travalena as Teddy
Richard Bakalyan as Snuffy
Tori Spelling as Frank Mcrae
Frank McRae as Tubbs
Robert Webber as J Woodrow Wilson
Kathleen Lloyd as Laura O'Keefe
Denny Miller as Tanner
John Randolph as Stevenson
David Faustino as Patrick
Robert Webber as Woodrow Norton
Efrem Zimbalist Jr. as Robert Cluso

References

External links
Shooting Stars at TCMDB
Shooting Stars at IMDb
Shooting Stars at BFI

1983 television films
1983 films
1980s action comedy films
ABC network original films
American television films
American action comedy films
Television films as pilots
Television pilots not picked up as a series
Films scored by Dominic Frontiere
Films directed by Richard Lang (director)
1980s American films